Kalamunda Community Radio 102.5FM is a not for profit Community Radio Station based in Perth, Western Australia.

KCR 102.5FM includes jazz, blues, country/western, hip hop, classical, gospel, folk, techno, popular easy listening, indigenous, contemporary and classic rock broadcasting 24 hours a day, seven days a week.

Programming 
Notable Programmes include Breakfast Variety - (Sunrise) and Afternoon Drive - (Traffic Jam).

External links 
 KCR-FM Official Website

Radio stations in Perth, Western Australia
Community radio stations in Australia